Saint Helena, part of the British overseas territory of Saint Helena, Ascension and Tristan da Cunha, competed in the 2010 Commonwealth Games held in Delhi, India, from 3 to 14 October 2010. Saint Helena sent a team of four shooters.

Shooting

Saint Helena's team consisted of 4 shooters.
 Rico Yon
 Cyril Leo
 Collin Knipe
 Carlos Yon

See also
 2010 Commonwealth Games

References

External links

Nations at the 2010 Commonwealth Games
2010 in Saint Helena, Ascension and Tristan da Cunha
Saint Helena at the Commonwealth Games